Darracq Motor Engineering Company Limited was a London importer, retailer and wholesaler of French-made Darracq  and Talbot automobiles, a coachbuilder making regular production runs of bodies for S T D group products and a property holding company on behalf of its parent S T D Motors Limited.

In 1935 its assets were sold following the financial collapse of S T D Motors in 1934. The coachbuilding business was bought by the Rootes brothers and lost its separate identity.

Purpose
In 1916 the board of A Darracq and Company (1905) Limited (later S T D Motors) elected to rearrange ownership of its Suresnes, Paris plant and the Darracq distribution system in London. Darracq Motor Engineering was incorporated to take over their assets located in Britain: 150 Bond Street showrooms, warehouses, service garages etc., including their Fulham, London Works, at that time making munitions, aircraft and components such as propellers and under the wartime control of the  Royal Aircraft Factory.

After incorporation Darracq Motor Engineering Company added to its British assets ownership of the Darracq land in France on which their Suresnes plant was situated. Darracq Motor Engineering then leased it to a new French company, Société Anonyme Darracq, incorporated to hold all the other French assets formerly held directly by A Darracq and Company (1905) Limited.

A Darracq and Company (1905) (soon to be renamed S T D Motors) was then reduced to a non-trading company holding ownership of the various French and British businesses.

Activities

After the 1918 Armistice the Fulham Works once again made motor car bodies for Darracqs and continued to assemble French-sourced components.

After 1920 offices and showrooms in The Vale, Acton at the intersection with Warple Way were shared with W & G Du Cros another group member.

In the expanded combine Darracq Motor Engineering also made bodies for Sunbeam of Wolverhampton and Talbot London. In spite of the manufacturer's name change Darracq Motor Engineering continued to import and sell SA Talbot cars sent from France for sale in Britain and brand them Darracq.

Rootes

The Rootes brothers folded the coachbuilding portion of this business into Clément-Talbot's In January 1935 and it lost its separate identity.

New cars remained available (and service and spares) from D.A.R.A. Co Limited at 1a Kilburn High Road, Maida Vale NW6. Rebadging of SA Talbot cars sent from Suresnes to Britain continued after the dissolution of Darracq Motor Engineering because Clément-Talbot's British business remained active. In 1938 Clément-Talbot's name was changed to Sunbeam-Talbot. After twenty years its products dropped Talbot from their badges in 1954.

Cars manufactured in Suresnes, Paris (1919–1938) 
at first badged Talbot Darracq and later Darracq for sale in Britain

Information assembled from The Autocar Buyer's Guide and published in Appendix V, Ian Nickols and Kent Karslake, Motoring Entente, Cassell, London 1956

Notes

References

External links
Talbot-Darracq 1921 models (from) Darracq Motor Engineering
 1938 Darracq and Lago brochure issued by D.A.R.A. Co
 1939 Darracq and Lago brochure issued by D.A.R.A. Co

S T D Motors
Darracq
Vehicle manufacture in London
Vehicle manufacturing companies established in 1905
Vehicle manufacturing companies disestablished in 1935
1905 establishments in England
1935 disestablishments in England
Defunct companies based in London